Thạnh Phú is a rural district of Bến Tre province in the Mekong Delta region of Vietnam. As of 2003 the district had a population of 131,964. The district covers an area of 401 km². The district capital lies at Thạnh Phú.  

The district is in the southeast of the province. To the north is the Hàm Luông River and Ba Tri district, to the south is the Chiên River and Trà Vinh province, to the west is Mỏ Cày district and to the east is the South China Sea.

The district capital is on National Highway 57 and is around 45 km southeast of Bến Tre.

Divisions
The district is divided into the following communes:

An Thạnh
An Thuận
Tân Phong
Thuận Phong
An Quy
Hòa Lợi
Thới Thạnh
Mỹ Hưng
Mỹ An
An Điền 
An Nhơn
Thạnh Hải
Đại Điền
Bình Thạnh
Phú Khánh
Giao Thạnh
Quới Điền

References

Districts of Bến Tre province